Morton Lake Provincial Park is a provincial park in British Columbia, Canada, located on Vancouver Island northwest of the city of Campbell River.

References
BC Parks webpage

External links

Provincial parks of British Columbia
Mid Vancouver Island
1966 establishments in British Columbia
Protected areas established in 1966